Mahmood Mosque may refer to:

 Mahmood Mosque (Kababir)
 Mahmood Mosque (Malmö)
 Mahmood Mosque (Regina)
 Mahmood Mosque (Zürich)